USS Indiana was the lead ship of her class and the first battleship in the United States Navy comparable to foreign battleships of the time. Authorized in 1890 and commissioned five years later, she was a small battleship, though with heavy armor and ordnance. The ship also pioneered the use of an intermediate battery. She was designed for coastal defense and as a result, her decks were not safe from high waves on the open ocean.

Indiana served in the Spanish–American War (1898) as part of the North Atlantic Squadron. She took part in both the blockade of Santiago de Cuba and the Battle of Santiago de Cuba, which occurred when the Spanish fleet attempted to break through the blockade. Although unable to join the chase of the escaping Spanish cruisers, she was partly responsible for the destruction of the Spanish destroyers Plutón and Furor. After the war, she quickly became obsolete—despite several modernizations—and spent most of her time in commission as a training ship or in the reserve fleet, with her last commission during World War I as a training ship for gun crews. She was decommissioned for the third and final time in January 1919 and was shortly after reclassified Coast Battleship Number 1 so that the name Indiana could be reused. She was sunk in shallow water as a target in aerial bombing tests in 1920, and her hull was sold for scrap in 1924.

Design 

Indiana was constructed from a modified version of a design drawn up by a US Navy policy board in 1889 for a short-range battleship. The original design was part of an ambitious naval construction plan to build 33 battleships and 167 smaller ships. The "coast defense" designation was reflected in Indianas moderate endurance, relatively small displacement and low freeboard, which limited seagoing capability. The ships proved to be disappointments in service, as they were badly overweight upon completion, their low freeboard hampered operations at sea, and they handled poorly. Conway's All the World's Fighting Ships describes her design as "attempting too much on a very limited displacement." They were nevertheless the first modern battleships for the American fleet.

As built, she was fitted with a heavy military mast, which was later supplemented by a stern cage mast in 1910–1911. She had a crew of 32 officers and 441 enlisted men, which increased to a total of 586–636 officers and enlisted.

The ship was armed with a main battery of four  /35 caliber guns in two twin gun turrets on the centerline, one forward and aft. The secondary battery consisted of eight  /35 cal. guns, which were placed in four twin wing turrets. These were supported by a battery of six  /40 cal. guns in a casemate battery amidships. For close-range defense against torpedo boats, she carried twenty 6-pounder guns and six 1-pounder guns in individual mounts. As was standard for capital ships of the period, Indiana carried  torpedo tubes in above-water mounts, though the number is unclear. According to Conway's, she was fitted with six tubes, though the naval historian Norman Friedman states she was ordered with seven but completed with five.

The 8 in turrets had 6 in of armor plating, and the casemate battery had .

Service history

Construction and early career 

Construction of the ships was authorized on 30 June 1890, and the contract for Indiana—not including guns and armor—was awarded to William Cramp & Sons in Philadelphia, who offered to build it for $3,020,000. The ship's total cost was almost twice as high, approximately $6,000,000. The contract specified the ship had to be built in three years, but slow delivery of armor plates caused a two-year delay. Indiana'''s keel was laid down on 7 May 1891 and she was launched on 28 February 1893, attended by around 10,000 people, including President Benjamin Harrison, several members of his cabinet and the two senators from Indiana. During her fitting-out in early March 1894, the ship undertook a preliminary sea trial to test her speed and machinery. At this point, her side armor, guns, turrets, and conning tower had not yet been fitted, and her official trials would not take place until October 1895 due to the delays in armor deliveries.Indiana was commissioned on 20 November 1895 under the command of Captain Robley D. Evans. After further trials, the ship joined the North Atlantic Squadron under the command of Rear Admiral Francis M. Bunce, which conducted training exercises along the East Coast of the United States. In late 1896, both main turrets broke loose from their clamps in heavy seas. Because the turrets were not centrally balanced, they swung from side to side with the ship's motion, until they were secured with heavy ropes. Heavier clamps were installed, but in February 1896, while conducting fleet maneuvers with the North Atlantic squadron, the Indiana encountered more bad weather and started rolling heavily. Her new captain, Henry Clay Taylor, promptly ordered her back to port for fear the clamps would break again. This convinced the navy that bilge keels—omitted during construction because, with them, the ship could not fit in most American dry docks—were necessary to reduce the rolling, and they were installed on all three ships of the Indiana-class.

 Spanish–American War 

At the outbreak of the Spanish–American War in April 1898, Indiana was at Key West with the rest of the North Atlantic Squadron, at the time commanded by Rear Admiral William T. Sampson. His squadron was ordered to the Spanish port of San Juan in an attempt to intercept and destroy Admiral Cervera's Spanish squadron, which was en route to the Caribbean from Spain. The harbor was empty, but Indiana and the rest of the squadron bombarded it for two hours on 12 May 1898 before realizing their mistake. The squadron returned to Key West, where news arrived three weeks later that Commodore Schley's Flying Squadron had found Cervera and was now blockading him in the port of Santiago de Cuba. Sampson reinforced Schley on 1 June and assumed overall command.

In an attempt to break the stalemate, it was decided to attack Santiago from land. A transport convoy was assembled in Key West, and Indiana was sent back to lead it. The expeditionary force, under the command of Major General William Rufus Shafter, landed east of the city and attacked it on 1 July. Cervera saw that his situation was desperate and attempted to break through the blockade on 3 July 1898, resulting in the battle of Santiago de Cuba. Admiral Sampson's flagship, the cruiser , had also sailed east earlier that morning for a meeting with General Shafter, leaving Commodore Schley in command. This left the blockade weakened and unbalanced on the day of the battle, as three modern battleships (Indiana, Oregon and ) and the armed yacht  guarded the east, while the west was only defended by the second-class battleship , cruiser  and armed yacht .

Occupying the extreme eastern position of the blockade, Indiana fired at the cruisers Infanta María Teresa and Almirante Oquendo as they left the harbor, but, due to engine problems, was unable to keep up with the Spanish cruisers as they fled to the west. When the Spanish destroyers Plutón and Furor emerged, Indiana was near the harbor entrance and, together with Iowa, she supported the armed yacht Gloucester in the destruction of the lightly armored enemy ships. She was then ordered to keep up the blockade of the harbor in case more Spanish ships came out and so played no role in the chase and sinking of the two remaining Spanish cruisers, Vizcaya and Cristóbal Colón.

 Post Spanish–American War 

After the war, Indiana returned to training exercises with the North Atlantic Squadron. In May 1900, she and Massachusetts were placed in reserve as the navy had an acute officer shortage and needed to put the new  and  into commission. The battleships were reactivated the following month as an experiment in how quickly this could be achieved, but Indiana was placed in the reserve fleet again that winter. In March 1901, it was decided to use her that summer for a midshipman practice cruise, and this would be her regular summer job for the next few years, while the rest of the time she would serve as a training ship. During her time as a training vessel, her crew beat the 1903 world record with eight-inch guns, four bullseyes with four shots. She was decommissioned on 29 December 1903 to be overhauled and modernized. The obsolete battleship received several upgrades: new Babcock & Wilcox boilers, counterweights to balance her main turrets, and electric traversing mechanisms for her turrets. She was recommissioned on 9 January 1906 and manned by the former crew of her sister ship Massachusetts, including Captain Edward D. Taussig, commanding. Massachusetts had been decommissioned the day before to receive similar modernization.

During her second commission, Indiana spent most of her time laid up in the reserve fleet, occasionally participating in practice cruises. In January 1907, she helped provide relief in the aftermath of the 1907 Kingston earthquake. In 1908, the /40 caliber guns and most of the lighter guns were removed to compensate for the counterweights added to the main battery turrets and because the ammunition supply for the guns was considered problematic. A year later, twelve /50 caliber single-purpose guns were added midships and in the fighting tops. At the same time, a cage mast was added. In early 1910, she was fitted with an experimental Lacoste speed brake, which would be deployed from the side of the hull to act as an emergency brake; the trials were inconclusive. By 1913 it was speculated that the ship might soon be used for target practice, but instead, the ship was decommissioned on 23 May 1914. After the United States entered World War I, Indiana was commissioned for the third time and served as a training ship for gun crews near Tompkinsville, Staten Island, and in the York River, and placed under the command of George Landenberger.

On 31 January 1919, she was decommissioned for the final time, and two months later, she was renamed Coast Battleship Number 1 so that the name Indiana could be assigned to the newly authorized—but never completed—battleship . The old battleship was brought to shallow waters in the Chesapeake Bay near the wreck of the target ship  (ex-Battleship Texas). Here she was subjected to aerial bombing tests conducted by the navy. She was hit with dummy bombs from aircraft, and explosive charges were set off at the positions where the bombs hit. The tests were a response to claims from Billy Mitchell—at the time assistant to Chief of Air Service Charles T. Menoher—who stated to Congress that the Air Service could sink any battleship. The conclusions drawn by the navy from the experiments conducted on Indiana were very different, as Captain William D. Leahy stated in his report: "The entire experiment pointed to the improbability of a modern battleship being either destroyed or completely put out of action by aerial bombs." Despite the navy's conclusions, Indiana sank during the test and settled in the shallow water, where she remained until her wreck was sold for scrap on 19 March 1924. When the US Navy adopted hull numbers in 1920, Indiana'' was retroactively assigned the number "BB-1".

Notes

References

Sources cited

Books

Newspapers

Other

Further reading

External links 

 
 MaritimeQuest USS Indiana BB-1 Photo Gallery
 

Indiana-class battleships
Spanish–American War battleships of the United States
World War I battleships of the United States
Ships built by William Cramp & Sons
1893 ships
Ships sunk as targets
Maritime incidents in 1920
Shipwrecks in the Chesapeake Bay